The 2017 K League Classic was the 35th season of the top division of South Korean professional football since its establishment in 1983, and the fifth season of the K League Classic.

Teams

General information

Locations

Stadiums

Foreign players
Restricting the number of foreign players strictly to four per team, including a slot for a player from AFC countries. A team could use four foreign players on the field each game including a least one player from the AFC confederation. Players name in bold indicates the player is registered during the mid-season transfer window.

League table

Positions by matchday

Round 1–33

Round 34–38

Results

Matches 1–22 
Teams play each other twice, once at home, once away.

Matches 23–33
Teams play every other team once (either at home or away).

Matches 34–38
After 33 matches, the league splits into two sections of six teams each, with teams playing every other team in their section once (either at home or away). The exact matches are determined upon the league table at the time of the split.

Group A

Group B

Relegation playoffs

Player statistics

Top scorers

Source:

Top assist providers

Source:

Awards

Main awards 
The 2017 K League Awards was held on 20 November 2017.

Source:

Best XI 

Source:

Player of the Round 

Source:

Manager of the Month 

Source:

Attendance

Attendance by club 
Attendants who entered with free ticket are not counted.

Top matches

See also 

 2017 in South Korean football
 2017 K League Challenge
 2017 Korean FA Cup

References

External links
Official website 
Official website 

K League Classic seasons